Tina Anselmi Cavaliere di Gran Croce OMRI (25 March 1927 – 1 November 2016) was a member of the Italian resistance movement during World War II who went on to become an Italian politician. She was the first woman to hold a ministerial position in an Italian government.

Early life
Anselmi was born in Castelfranco Veneto, Treviso. Her father was an assistant pharmacist persecuted by the fascists because he was socialist, and her mother and grandmother ran an inn together.

She attended the local high school, and then the Teaching Institute in Bassano del Grappa. On 26 September 1944, Nazi soldiers forced her and a group of other students to witness the hanging of a group of 31 young Partisans. As a result, she joined the Italian Resistance movement and became part of the Cesare Battisti brigade. That year, she also joined the Christian Democracy Party. After World War II, she studied literature at the Catholic University of Milan and became a primary school teacher.

Political career
While working as a teacher, Anselmi held positions in Christian trade unions, including the primary teachers' union from 1948–55. In 1959, she joined the national council of the Christian Democracy Party, and she was the party's deputy leader from 1968–92. In 1963, she was elected vice-president of the Female Board of the European Union. From 1958–64, she was head of the Christian Democracy party's youth programmes.

From 1968 to 1987, she was a Member of the Italian Chamber of Deputies, re-elected five times in the Venice-Treviso district. She served three times as undersecretary to the Department of Labour and Social Services, and in 1976 she became the first woman to be a member of an Italian cabinet, being chosen by Giulio Andreotti as Minister for Labour and Social Security. She held this position from 1976–79. She served as Minister for Health from 1978 to 1979.

Anselmi is best known for having been the main proposer of Italian laws on equal opportunities, a matter she always fought for in her political life. For example in 1977, she passed a bill which recognized fathers as primary caregivers for their children, and allowed for both fathers and mothers to have time away for their children. In the same year, a major piece of legislation was passed on gender parity in employment conditions, of which Anselmi was a key supporter. She chaired the National Equal Opportunities Commission until 1994, and played a significant role in the introduction of Italy's National Health Service.

In 1981, she headed the Parliamentary Commission of Inquiry into the illegal P2 Masonic Lodge (Commissione parlamentare d’inchiesta sulla Loggia massonica P2); the lodge, at the time, was considered a threat to society. Anselmi wrote the commission's final majority report that was approved in 1984, and all activity of the lodge ceased the following year.

Anselmi was the chair of a commission of inquiry into the work of Italian soldiers in Somalia, and of a national commission on the consequences of laws for the Italian Jewish community. She was an honorary vice president of the National Institute for the History of the Liberation Movement in Italy.

Later in her life, she began to write about her experiences in the Resistance; in 2003, she wrote Zia, cos'è la Resistenza? (Auntie, what's the Resistance?), a book explaining the Italian Resistance to young people.

In 2004, she wrote a second book for young people, titled Bella ciao: la resistenza raccontata ai ragazzi (Hey beautiful: the Resistance explained to children).

In 2006, she published her memoir together with Anna Vinci, as Storia Di Una Passione Politica (Story of a Passion for Politics).

Death
Anselmi died at home in Castelfranco Veneto, Treviso, on 31 October 2016, aged 89.

Recognition and awards
On 18 June 1998, Anselmi was awarded the Knight's Great Cross of the Order of Merit of the Italian Republic.

In June 2016, Anselmi was featured on an Italian postage stamp, the only living person to be honoured in this way.

Electoral history

References

External links

 Tina Anselmi on Radio Radicale

1927 births
2016 deaths
People with Parkinson's disease
People from Castelfranco Veneto
Università Cattolica del Sacro Cuore alumni
Christian Democracy (Italy) politicians
Italian Ministers of Health
Italian resistance movement members
Knights Grand Cross of the Order of Merit of the Italian Republic
Italian memoirists
Women government ministers of Italy
20th-century Italian women politicians
Women memoirists